Dudley Blodget (also spelled Blodgett; 1820 in Randolph, Vermont – December 1856 in Oshkosh, Wisconsin) was a member of the Wisconsin State Assembly. 

On May 1, 1845, he married Mary Granger. They would have four children.

Career
Blodget was a member of the Assembly during the 1852 session. He was a Whig.

References

People from Randolph, Vermont
Politicians from Oshkosh, Wisconsin
Members of the Wisconsin State Assembly
Wisconsin Whigs
19th-century American politicians
1820 births
1856 deaths